Dasydemellidae is a family of Psocodea (formerly Psocoptera) belonging to the suborder Psocomorpha, in the infraorder Caeciliusetae. The family is composed of about 30 species.

References

 Lienhard, C. & Smithers, C. N. 2002. Psocoptera (Insecta): World Catalogue and Bibliography. Instrumenta Biodiversitatis, vol. 5. Muséum d'histoire naturelle, Genève.

Psocoptera families
Caeciliusetae